Ghost Rider is a 2007 American superhero film based on the Marvel Comics character of the same name. The film was written and directed by Mark Steven Johnson, known for helming 2003's Daredevil previously, and stars Nicolas Cage as Johnny Blaze / Ghost Rider, with Eva Mendes, Wes Bentley, Sam Elliott, Donal Logue, Matt Long, and Peter Fonda in supporting roles.

Ghost Rider was released on February 16, 2007, in the United States. The film was met with negative reviews from critics, but was a box office success, earning $228.7 million worldwide on a $110 million budget. Ghost Rider was released on DVD, Blu-ray and UMD on June 12, 2007. A sequel, titled Ghost Rider: Spirit of Vengeance, was released on February 17, 2012, with Cage reprising his role.

Plot 

The demon Mephistopheles sends his bounty hunter of the damned, the Ghost Rider, to retrieve the contract of San Venganza for control of a thousand corrupt souls. Seeing that the agreement would give Mephistopheles the power to bring hell on Earth, the Rider refuses and escapes with it. In 1986, Mephistopheles reaches out to 17-year-old Johnny Blaze, offering to cure his father's cancer in exchange for Johnny's soul. The next morning, Johnny awakens to discover the cancer cured, but his father dies later that same day from burns sustained in a stunt accident. Johnny accuses Mephistopheles of causing his father's death, but Mephistopheles considers his side of the contract fulfilled and promises to see Johnny again.

Mephistopheles' son Blackheart comes to Earth and seeks aid from the Hidden (three fallen angels bonded with the elements of air, earth, and water) to find the lost contract of San Venganza.

In 2007, Johnny has become a famous stunt motorcycle rider. He runs into his former sweetheart Roxanne Simpson, now a news reporter, whom he abandoned after his father's death. He convinces her to attend a dinner date.

Mephistopheles makes Johnny the new Ghost Rider and offers to return his soul if he defeats Blackheart. Johnny transforms into the Ghost Rider, his flesh burning off his skeleton, and kills the earth angel Gressil. He then uses the Penance Stare, a power that causes mortals to feel all the pain they have caused others, searing their soul, on a street thug. The next day, he meets a man called the Caretaker, who knows about the Ghost Rider's history. He assures Johnny that what happened was real and will happen again, especially at night, when he is near an evil soul.

Johnny leaves to find Roxanne, who's reporting the previous night's events on the news. At home, Johnny tries to control his firepower. Roxanne comes to visit before leaving town, and Johnny reveals himself as the Devil's bounty hunter. Unconvinced, she walks away in disbelief. After brief imprisonment for murders Blackheart committed, Johnny kills the air angel Abigor and escapes from the police. He returns to the Caretaker, who tells him of his predecessor Carter Slade, a Texas Ranger who hid the contract of San Venganza. At home, Johnny discovers that Blackheart has killed his friend Mack and taken Roxanne hostage, intending to kill her if Johnny does not deliver the contract. Johnny tries to use the Penance Stare on Blackheart, but it proves ineffective as Blackheart has no soul. Blackheart then orders Johnny to retrieve the contract and bring it to him in San Venganza.

Johnny returns to the Caretaker, demanding the contract to save Roxanne. The Caretaker reveals that it is hidden inside a spade, telling Johnny that he is more powerful than his predecessors because he sold his soul for love rather than greed, before giving the contract. The Caretaker then transforms with Blaze, revealing that the Caretaker was actually Carter Slade. Slade then leads Johnny to San Venganza and gives him a lever-action shotgun before bidding farewell and apparently having finally shaken off the curse, fades into dust as he rides away.

After killing the water angel Wallow, Johnny gives Blackheart the contract. He transforms into the Ghost Rider to subdue Blackheart, but is rendered powerless at sunrise. Using the contract to absorb the thousand souls, Blackheart attempts to finish Johnny off, but is distracted when Roxanne uses Johnny's discarded shotgun to separate them. Johnny shoots Blackheart with the gun, holding it in the shadows to allow him to enhance it with his power. Keeping his own body in shadow, he transforms again and uses his Penance Stare to render Blackheart catatonic by burning all the corrupt souls within him. Mephistopheles appears and declares the contract is complete, offering to take back the curse of the Ghost Rider. Determined not to let anyone else make another deal, Johnny declines, declaring that he will use his power against the demon and against all harm that comes to the innocent. Infuriated, Mephistopheles vows to make Johnny pay and disappears with Blackheart's body. Roxanne tells Johnny that he has his second chance and kisses him. Johnny rides away on his motorcycle, preparing for his new life as the Ghost Rider.

Cast 
 Nicolas Cage as Johnny Blaze / Ghost Rider: A motorcycle stunt rider, who is tricked into making a deal with the demon lord Mephisto thinking that it will save his father from dying, and is subsequently transformed into a supernatural demonic soul hunter, the Devil's Spirit of Vengeance, the Ghost Rider. As his work for Mephisto continues, he hunts down the demons which have escaped from Hell.
 Matt Long as young Johnny Blaze
 Eva Mendes as Roxanne Simpson: Johnny's childhood love-interest, and current girlfriend who is a news reporter.
 Raquel Alessi as young Roxanne Simpson
 Wes Bentley as Blackheart: A demon who is the son of Mephisto, and wants to use the Contract of San Venganza in order to unleash Hell on Earth.
 Sam Elliott as Carter Slade: A former Ghost Rider or Phantom Rider, and an ally and mentor to Blaze. Elliott previously worked with Marvel as General Thunderbolt Ross in Hulk (2003).
 Donal Logue as Mack: A member of Johnny's team and his own impresario.
 Peter Fonda as Mephistopheles "Mephisto": The demon lord with whom Blaze makes a contractual deal in order to save the latter's father from cancer. Deceivingly, Mephisto causes Blaze's father to die the next day in a motorcycling accident. Mephisto is in search for his illegitimate son, Blackheart, who seeks to overthrow him. The two race in search of the Contract of San Venganza, a binding note of 1,000 evil souls.
 Brett Cullen as Barton Blaze: Johnny Blaze's deceased father, and former motorcycle stunt rider.
 David Roberts as Captain Jack Dolan: A police captain.
 Laurence Breuls as Gressil: A Fallen Angel with earth-based powers, and one of Blackheart's minions.
 Daniel Frederiksen as Wallow: A Fallen Angel with water-based powers, and one of Blackheart's minions.
 Mathew Wilkinson as Abigor: A Fallen Angel with wind-based powers, and one of Blackheart's minions.
 Rebel Wilson as a girl in the alley.
 Jessica Napier as a Broken Spoke waitress.

Production

Development

Marvel began development for Ghost Rider as early as 1992 and were in discussions with potential producers to sell the rights to. In 1997, Gale Anne Hurd was listed as producer, with Jonathan Hensleigh attached to write the script. David S. Goyer developed a script and in May 2000, Marvel announced an agreement with Crystal Sky Entertainment to film Ghost Rider with actor Jon Voight attached as a producer. Production was scheduled to start in early 2001 with a budget of $75 million and Johnny Depp expressing interest in the lead role. The following August, Dimension Films joined Crystal Sky to co-finance the film, which would be directed by Stephen Norrington. Producer Avi Arad approached Eric Bana on the possibility of playing Ghost Rider, but opted to cast him in Hulk instead. In June 2001, actor and Ghost Rider fan Nicolas Cage entered talks to be cast into the lead role, after having found out about Depp being a possibility for the role and contacted the director to express his own interest. Norrington would drop out within a few months due his commitment to Tick Tock and Cage eventually left the project as well. By May 2002, Columbia Pictures sought to acquire rights to Ghost Rider in turnaround from Dimension Films following their success with Spider-Man. They brought Shane Salerno to rewrite Goyer's script.

Pre-production
In April 2003, under Columbia Pictures, director Mark Steven Johnson took over the helm for Ghost Rider with Cage returning for the lead role. Johnson, rewriting Salerno's script, was set to begin production of Ghost Rider in late 2003 or early 2004, but it was delayed to October. Cage took a temporary leave of absence to film The Weather Man. Ghost Rider production was slated to tentatively begin in May or June 2004. Despite the previous listed actors, Johnson claimed that Cage was the only actor they considered for the role of Johnny Blaze. Cage said that the film should be Rated R.

Ghost Rider had again been delayed to begin in late 2004, but the lack of a workable script continued to delay production. Johnson revealed that the original draft featured the character Scarecrow as the main villain, but the studio convinced him to change it to Blackheart so that audiences did not confuse him for the DC character of the same name. Actor Wes Bentley was cast as the Blackheart, having been introduced to Johnson by Colin Farrell, who had worked with the director in Daredevil.  Actress Eva Mendes was also cast opposite Cage as Roxanne Simpson.

Filming
Ghost Rider commenced filming in Australia at the Melbourne Docklands film studios on February 14, 2005. In March, actor Peter Fonda (who starred in Easy Rider) was cast as the villain Mephistopheles.  Johnson originally planned to film before an audience at the Docklands Stadium, but instead opted to create a crowd using computer-generated imagery. The director also chose to film in the motorcycle district of Melbourne. By June 2005, principal photography had been completed for Ghost Rider, which was set for a summer 2006 release.

In April 2006, the cast and crew performed last-minute reshoots in Vancouver.

Character portrayal

Instead of a "hard drinking and smoking bad ass" Johnny Blaze, Nicolas Cage decided to give him more depth: "I'm playing him more as someone who... made this deal and he's trying to avoid confronting it, anything he can do to keep it away from him". Cage also explained that Blaze's stunt riding was a form of escape and a way to keep him connected to his deceased father, who taught him to ride.  Cage rode a Buell motorcycle for Blaze's stunt cycle, and a heavily customized hardtail chopper named "Grace" which transforms into the "Hell Cycle". The Hell Cycle's wheels, made of pure flames in the comics, were changed to be solid tires covered in flames in order to give the motorcycle more weight onscreen.

The film's visual effects supervisor, Kevin Mack, and the visual effects team at Sony Pictures Imageworks handled the difficult task of creating computer-generated fire on a shot-by-shot basis. Ghost Rider's skull flames were designed to become smaller and blue to display any emotion other than rage. Kevin's Team at Imageworks also created computer-generated motorcycles, chains, water, black goo, dementors and buildings. To pull off such effects as the living morph where the hardtail chopper ("Grace") comes alive to become the "Hell Cycle", Sony enlisted teams of animators, models, effects artists, lighters & "Flame" artists. The department supervisors for these teams at Imageworks included Kevin Hudson, Brian Steiner, JD Cowels, Marco Marenghi, Joe Spadaro, Joanie Karnowski, Vincent Serritella & Patrick Witting. Patrick's team bore the brunt of the work as they created the fire using a custom pipeline that automated the set up starting with Maya animated geometry driving Maya Fluids, imported into Houdini and then rendered & composited on top of the live action plates. Patrick and his team set up the fire process and much of the front end automation was set up by Scott Palleiko and Joe Spadaro. The fire was then tweaked and manipulated to look and move believably by Patrick's eleven man Houdini effects team. All of this was enabled by effects producers Daniel Kuehn and the Digital Effects Supervisor Kee-Suk 'Ken' Hahn.

The digital version of the hell cycle was modeled in detail by Kevin Hudson and based on the practical prop used in the film, it included animatable skeletal hands that came alive to wrap the gas tank during the supernatural transformation scene. The transformation scene was animated by Max Tyrie and finalized by Joe Spadaro. Each part of the "Grace" geometry had to match up and morph with a piece of geometry on the "Hell Cycle".

Ghost Rider's voice was manipulated by sound designer Dane Davis, who won an Academy Award for Sound Editing for The Matrix. Davis filtered Cage's line readings through three different kinds of animal growls that were played backwards and covered separate frequencies. Davis then amplified the dialogue through a mechanical volumizer. Director Johnson described the sound as a "deep, demonic, mechanical lion's roar".

Music 

Christopher Young composed Ghost Rider score. In addition, Spiderbait, a band that Johnson befriended during filming in Australia, performed a cover of "Ghost Riders in the Sky" for the end credits.

Track listing

Marketing

In May 2005, Sony Pictures launched the official website for Ghost Rider. The following July, the studio presented a Ghost Rider panel at Comic-Con International and screened a teaser for the audience. The teaser, which did not have finalized footage of the film, eventually leaked online. In the same month, Majesco Entertainment Company announced its deal with Marvel to acquire worldwide rights to produce the video game Ghost Rider for the PS2, PSP, and Game Boy Advance consoles. In December, the studio presented a first glimpse of Ghost Rider in a ten-second footage piece on the official site. In April 2006, Sideshow Collectibles announced the sale of a Ghost Rider maquette based on the concept art of the film. The following May, domestic and international teaser trailers for Ghost Rider were launched at Apple. The Ghost Rider was also featured in a commercial for Jackson Hewitt Tax Services in which the character presented his income tax forms to a clerk for processing to receive a quick refund check.

Release

Theatrical
Ghost Rider was originally scheduled to release on August 4, 2006, but the date was moved three weeks earlier to July 14. Sony changed the film's release date once more to February 16, 2007 to help relieve the studio's crowded 2006 calendar.

Home media
Sony Pictures Home Entertainment released the film on June 12, 2007 as a single-disc Theatrical Cut DVD, two-disc Extended Cut DVD, Blu-ray Disc, and UMD. Special features on the Extended Cut DVD include two commentary tracks, a comic book history feature, and a making of the film featurette.

Reception

Box office 
Ghost Rider was commercially released in the United States on February 16, 2007. The film grossed $15,420,123 on its opening day, while earning $45,388,836 for its opening weekend. The film earned $52,022,908 over the four-day President's Day weekend, with a per-theater average of $US 14,374 in 3,619 theaters. This made it the highest President's Day opening weekend at the time, surpassing the three-day record held by Daredevil and the four-day record held by 50 First Dates simultaneously. The film would go on to hold these records until 2010 when Valentine's Day took them. The film's total earnings were $228,738,393 worldwide of which $115,802,596 was from North America.

Critical response 
The site's critical consensus states: "Ghost Rider is a sour mix of morose, glum histrionics amidst jokey puns and hammy dialogue". Metacritic gave the film a weighted average score of 35 out of 100 based on reviews from 20 critics. Audiences polled by CinemaScore gave it a grade "B".

Michael Ordoña of the Los Angeles Times and Jeannette Catsoulis of the New York Times expressed disappointment in the film. Ordoña said "for a comic book with a rebel spirit, the adaptation feels obediently conventional", and Catsoulis said Johnny Blaze is "more funny than frightening". Although Eric Alt of the Chicago Tribune praised the computer-generated effects of the film, he also criticized it, calling it a "clumsy, lifeless outing".

IGN ranked the film 7th on its list of the 10 worst comic book films of the decade.

Accolades

The film was nominated for one Razzie Award for Nicolas Cage as Golden Raspberry Award for Worst Actor. However, the film was also nominated for Best Horror Film at the Saturn Awards.

Sequel 

A sequel, entitled Spirit of Vengeance, was released on February 17, 2012. Cage reprised his role as Johnny Blaze and also portrayed Johnny Blaze in his Ghost Rider form. Crank filmmakers Neveldine/Taylor directed the film. The film received worse reviews than its predecessor, but was still a financial success.

When asked about a potential third film, Cage said that it could happen, but without his involvement. In 2013 the rights reverted to Marvel Studios, effectively cancelling plans for a third film. The Robbie Reyes version of the Ghost Rider later appeared in the TV series Agents of S.H.I.E.L.D., set in the Marvel Cinematic Universe.

In popular culture 
Craig Ferguson, former host of The Late Late Show, has mentioned that his robot skeleton sidekick Geoff Peterson was inspired by Cage's portrayal of Ghost Rider in this film and its sequel.

Notes

References

External links 

 
 
 
 Ghost Rider at Marvel.com
 

Ghost Rider (film series)
2007 horror films
2000s action horror films
2000s monster movies
2007 fantasy films
2007 films
2000s superhero films
2000s supernatural films
American action horror films
American fantasy action films
American superhero films
American supernatural horror films
American supernatural thriller films
American vigilante films
Australian action adventure films
Columbia Pictures films
Crystal Sky Pictures films
Demons in film
2000s English-language films
Films about stunt performers
Films directed by Mark Steven Johnson
Films produced by Michael De Luca
Films scored by Christopher Young
Films set in Texas
Films shot in Australia
Films with screenplays by Mark Steven Johnson
The Devil in film
Relativity Media films
Superhero horror films
Works based on the Faust legend
2000s American films
Live-action films based on Marvel Comics